Emmanuel Ikechukwu Ogbah (born November 6, 1993) is a Nigerian professional American football defensive end for the Miami Dolphins of the National Football League (NFL). He played college football at Oklahoma State, and was drafted by the Cleveland Browns in the second round of the 2016 NFL Draft.

Early years
Ogbah was born in Lagos, Nigeria and moved to Houston, Texas in the United States at the age of nine. He attended George Bush High School in Fort Bend County, Texas. He committed to Oklahoma State University to play college football. He chose Oklahoma State in part based on recommendations from Russell Okung and attended George Bush High and Oklahoma State.

College career
After redshirting as a true freshman in 2012, Ogbah played in all 13 games of the 2013 season. He finished the year with 20 tackles and four sacks. As a sophomore in 2014, he was named the Big-12 Defensive Lineman of the Year after recording 49 tackles and 11 sacks.

Professional career

Cleveland Browns
Ogbah was drafted by the Cleveland Browns in the second round, 32nd overall, of the 2016 NFL Draft. On May 25, 2016, he signed a four-year contract worth $6.6 million, which included a $3 million signing bonus. Ogbah was listed as a starter for the Browns for the season opener. He started all 16 games for the Browns as a rookie, finishing sixth on the team with 53 tackles and leading the team with 5.5 sacks.

In 2017, Ogbah entered the season as the Browns' starting defensive end. He started the first 10 games before suffering a foot injury in Week 11. It was revealed that he suffered a fractured foot and was ruled out for the season. He was placed on injured reserve on November 21, 2017.

Kansas City Chiefs
Ogbah was traded to the Kansas City Chiefs on April 1, 2019 in exchange for safety Eric Murray.
In week 3 against the Baltimore Ravens, Ogbah sacked Lamar Jackson 1.5 times as the Chiefs won 33-28. In Week 10, Ogbah suffered a torn pectoral and was ruled out the rest of the season. He finished the season with 32 tackles and tied his career-high with 5.5 sacks. Without Ogbah, the Chiefs won Super Bowl LIV against the San Francisco 49ers.

Miami Dolphins
On March 20, 2020, Ogbah signed a two-year, $15 million contract with the Miami Dolphins.

In Week 5 against the San Francisco 49ers, Ogbah recorded a strip sack on C. J. Beathard late in the fourth quarter which was recovered by the Dolphins to secure a 43–17 win.
In Week 9 against the Arizona Cardinals, Ogbah recorded a strip sack on Kyler Murray which was recovered by teammate Shaq Lawson who returned it for a 36 yard touchdown during the 34–31 win.

On March 14, 2022, Ogbah signed a four-year, $65 million contract extension with the Dolphins.

In Week 10 against the Cleveland Browns, Ogbah suffered a season-ending injury requiring surgery.

References

External links
Cleveland Browns bio
Oklahoma State Cowboys bio

1993 births
Living people
American football defensive ends
American football linebackers
Cleveland Browns players
Kansas City Chiefs players
Miami Dolphins players
Nigerian emigrants to the United States
Nigerian players of American football
Oklahoma State Cowboys football players
Players of American football from Houston
People from Richmond, Texas
Sportspeople from Lagos